Podolsk is a railway station of Line D2 of the Moscow Central Diameters in Moscow Oblast. It was opened in 1865 and rebuilt in 2020.

Gallery

References

Railway stations in Moscow Oblast
Railway stations of Moscow Railway
Railway stations in the Russian Empire opened in 1865
Line D2 (Moscow Central Diameters) stations
Cultural heritage monuments of regional significance in Moscow Oblast